Bluff is a town in San Juan County, Utah, United States. The population was 320 at the 2000 census. Bluff incorporated in 2018. Ann Leppanen is currently the mayor.

History
Under the direction of John Taylor, Silas S. Smith and Danish settler Jens Nielson led about 230 Mormons on an expedition to start a farming community in southeastern Utah.  After forging about 200 miles (320 kilometers) of their own trail over difficult terrain, the settlers arrived on the site of Bluff in April 1880. (The trail followed went over and down the "Hole in the Rock", which now opens into one of the tributaries of Lake Powell.) The town was named for the bluffs near the town site. The town's population had declined to seventy by 1930 but rebounded during a uranium prospecting boom in the 1950s. With the uranium decline in the 1970s, Bluff again declined and now remains a small town with about 200 residents.

Geography
Bluff is located in the sparsely populated southeastern Utah canyonlands of the Colorado Plateau. The community is on the north margin of the San Juan River valley at the confluence of Cottonwood Wash with the San Juan. U.S. routes 163 and 191 and State Route 162 pass through the community.

According to the United States Census Bureau, the town has a total area of 22.6 square miles (58.7 km2), of which 22.1 square miles (57.2 km2) is land and 0.6 square mile (1.4 km2) (2.43%) is water.

Climate

Bluff has a cold desert climate (Köppen BWk) typical of southern Utah, though it borders on a cold semi-arid climate (BSk). Winters are cool and dry with occasional snow. Despite averaging just over 8” of snow per year, only three seasons have gone without snow (1928-1929, 1963-1964, and 1995-1996). The snowiest season was 1978-1979, with 28.0”. Nights are chilly, falling below freezing on 141 days per year, while only seven days fail to rise above freezing. Bluff is located in hardiness zone 7A, with an average yearly low of 1. Spring comes quickly in February and is the driest time of the year. Temperatures are usually warm, although snow has fallen as late as April (although very rarely). The average last freeze is April 25. Summer is long and hot with occasional thunderstorms. Days reach 90 degrees, an average of 86 days per year, and attain highs of 100 or greater on 16. Despite the hot days, nights cool to the low 60s. While September is still hot, temperatures cool rapidly in October and November. Snow has fallen in October but usually holds off until late November. The first freeze typically comes on October 7.

Demographics

As of the census of 2000, there were 320 people, 135 households, and 75 families residing in the town. The population density was 14.5 people per square mile (5.6/km2). There were 191 housing units at an average density of 8.6/sq mi (3.3/km2). The racial makeup of the town was 62.50% White, 35.00% Native American, 0.94% from other races, and 1.56% from two or more races. Hispanic or Latino of any race were 4.06% of the population.

There were 135 households, of which 28.9% had children under 18 living with them, 47.4% were married couples living together, 5.9% had a female householder with no husband present, and 44.4% were non-families. 35.6% of all households were made up of individuals, and 5.2% had someone living alone who was 65 years of age or older. The average household size was 2.37, and the average family size was 3.25.

In the town, the population was spread out, with 25.9% under 18, 8.8% from 18 to 24, 29.1% from 25 to 44, 25.6% from 45 to 64, and 10.6% who were 65 years of age or older. The median age was 38 years. For every 100 females, there were 102.5 males. For every 100 females aged 18 and over, there were 104.3 males.

The median income for a household in the town was $23,906, and the median income for a family was $30,938. Males had a median income of $31,563 versus $14,792 for females. The per capita income for the CDP was $13,567. About 22.8% of families and 21.9% of the population were below the poverty line, including 27.7% of those under age 18 and 25.0% of those aged 65 or over.

Education
The San Juan School District operates Bluff Elementary School in Bluff.

Attractions and events

Bluff Fort and Visitors Center
Navajo Twin Rocks
Bluff Pioneer Cemetery
Trading Post
Bears Ear Education Center
Historic buildings and sites of Bluff Historic District and other listings on the National Register of Historic Places in Bluff.

Events:
 Winter Balloon Festival, January 
 Bluff Arts Festival, October and Utah Navajo Fair, September

Notable people
 Charles Lang, Academy Award-winning cinematographer
 Albert R. Lyman, writer
 Jane McKechnie Walton, pioneer
 Ellen Meloy, writer
 Charles Redd, rancher and member of the Utah House of Representatives

See also

 List of census-designated places in Utah
 Design Build Bluff

References

External links

 

Census-designated places in San Juan County, Utah
Census-designated places in Utah
Populated places established in 1880
1880 establishments in Utah Territory